Huili or Hui Li may refer to:

 Huili City in Sichuan Province, China
 Huili (monk), Indian Buddhist monk in China
 Warrior (shoes) (Chinese name Huili), a Chinese shoes brand